is a song recorded by Japanese singer Maaya Sakamoto and Japanese musician Cornelius. It was released as a double A-side single alongside the song "Anata o Tamotsu Mono" by FlyingDog on June 17, 2015. It was written by Shintaro Sakamoto of the band Yura Yura Teikoku and composed by Cornelius, who produced and arranged the track as well as playing all instruments. "Mada Ugoku" is the theme song to the animated film Ghost in the Shell: The New Movie.

Chart performance
The single entered the daily Oricon Singles Chart at number 15. It peaked at number 10 on the daily chart. The single debuted at number 18 on the weekly Oricon Singles Chart, with 4,000 copies sold. It charted for four consecutive weeks, selling a reported total of 6,000 copies.

Track listing

Credits and personnel
Personnel

 Vocals – Maaya Sakamoto
 Songwriting – Shintaro Sakamoto, Cornelius
 Arrangement, all instruments – Cornelius
 Engineering, programming – Toyoaki Mishima
 Mixing, mastering – Tohru Takayama

Charts

References

2015 songs
2015 singles
Anime songs
Songs written for animated films
Maaya Sakamoto songs
Ghost in the Shell anime and manga
FlyingDog singles